Railway stations in Sudan include:

Maps 
 UNHCR Atlas Map
 UN Map
 Different maps Aljabalan map

 Sudan and South Sudan Map

Existing and Proposed 
  Aswan
  Toshka & Abu Simbel - proposed
   - border
  Wadi Halfa - N - potential break-of-gauge with Egypt
 Merowe
 Karima - branch terminus on River Nile - N
 Abu Hamed - N junction for Karima
 Barbar
 Atbara - N - junction and workshops
 Ad-Damir

 Port Sudan - E
 Jubayt - N
 Sinkat - N
 Hayya - N - junction
 Gadamai
 Shendi
 Omdurman
 Khartoum  - C - national capital
 Kassala - E - stillborn link to Eritrea
 Gedaref - E
 Wad Medani - C
 Sannar - S - junction to West
 Rabak - east bank of River Nile; bridge; junction to south to Al Jabalayn
 Al Jabalayn - C - branch terminus
 Kosti - C - west bank of River Nile; bridge
 Tandalti - W
 Abu Zabad - W

 Sannar - S - junction
 Damazin - S

 Muglad - S
 Aweil - S - South Sudan

 Muglad - junction to oil fields
 Abu Jabra - oil fields

 Ar Rahad - S - junction
 Al Ubayyid aka El Obeid - E - railhead

  Ar Rahad - S - junction
  Babanusa - S - junction
   border
  Aweil - S - South Sudan
  Wau - S - terminus - on Jur River - South Sudan

 Babanusa - S - junction
 Nyala - W - terminus
 Purram
 Tumburra
 Samsum

  Kassala - nearest station in Sudan to former link line to Eritrea
  Teseney, Eritrea - discontinued - break of gauge 1067mm/950mm

Ferry 

A weekly ferry service on the Nile River connects the Egyptian railhead at Aswan with the Sudan railhead at Wadi Halfa.

Reopen 

 Babanusa Junction
 Wau

Proposed 

  Link to Egypt - May 2008
  Aswan
   border
  Wadi Halfa - N

(connection to Uganda - North to South) - Electrification proposed
  Wau -  gauge
  Juba - port on River Nile ; national capital
   Nimule - border
  Gulu gauge
  Tororo, Uganda
  Pakwach - port on White Nile

  Rongai
  Lake Baringo
  Lokichar
  Lodwar
   border Kenya-South Sudan
  Juba

(connection to Kenya)
  Garissa
  Rongai
  Mombassa - port

(connection to Ethiopia)
 (standard gauge)
 Ethiopia
  Addis Ababa (0 km)
  Bedele (491 km)
   border Ethiopia-Sudan
  junction.
  branch to Port Sudan.
  Khartoum

 Transcontinental railway from Dakar and/or from Cameroon to Port Sudan via Chad.

See also 

 Egypt-Sudan Railway Committee
 Transport in Sudan
 Rail transport in Sudan
 Railway stations in Egypt
 Railway stations in Eritrea
 Railway stations in Ethiopia
 Railway stations in South Sudan
 Railway stations in Uganda

References

External links

 
Railway stations
Railway STATIONS